Rev. Richard Henry Singleton (September 11, 1865, Hilton Head, SC - 1923, Atlanta) led the Big Bethel AME Church in Atlanta, Georgia. He began his service to the church in 1893 and started at Big Bethel in 1916. He was trustee of Morris Brown University and president of the local chapter of the NAACP.

In 1919 he was selected to represent "his church and his race" at the Paris Peace Conference, one of a group of ten American blacks who would confer with President Woodrow Wilson and his conferees over the future of the German colonies in Africa (roughly present day Cameroon, Tanzania, Rwanda, Burundi, Namibia and Togo).

Singleton spoke at the 1921 opening of Joyland Park, Atlanta's first amusement park for blacks.

Singleton died in 1923.

References

NAACP activists
1865 births
1923 deaths
African Methodist Episcopal Church clergy
People from Hilton Head, South Carolina